Burrs Mill is an unincorporated community located within Southampton Township in Burlington County, New Jersey, United States. Found in a rural portion of the township near Route 70, it is located along its eponymous brook in a forested area within the Pine Barrens. A low density of houses surround nearby roads including Burrs Mill Road and Route 70's fire roads.

References

Southampton Township, New Jersey
Populated places in the Pine Barrens (New Jersey)
Unincorporated communities in Burlington County, New Jersey
Unincorporated communities in New Jersey